This is a list of buildings that are examples of Art Deco in the Americas:

Argentina 

 Palacio Minetti, Santa Fe, 1931
 Cine Parque Belgrano, Santa Fe
 Mercado del Norte, Tucumán

Córdoba 

 , Córdoba, 1935
 , Córdoba, 1936
 , Córdoba, 1936
 , Córdoba, 1944
 Hospital San Roque, Córdoba
 Instituto Provincial de Educación Media Nicolás Avellaneda, Córdoba

Buenos Aires, D.F (Capital) 
source:

 Alas Building, Buenos Aires, 1957
 Argentine Library for the Blind, Lezica branch), Buenos Aires, 1940s
 Armed Forces Center of Study, Buenos Aires, 1949
 Banco El Hogar Argentino, Buenos Aires, 1926
 Banco de la Provincia de Buenos Aires [es], Buenos Aires, 1939
 Casa del Teatro, Buenos Aires, 1927
 Centro Metropolitano de Diseño [es], Buenos Aires, 1938
 Cine Cosmos, Buenos Aires, 1929
 Colegio Don Bosco, Buenos Aires, 1930s 
 Colegio Las Esclavas del Sagrado Corazón de Jesús, Buenos Aires, 1934
 Diario Crítica Building, Buenos Aires, 1927
 Dorrego Building [es], Buenos Aires, 1936
 Facultad de Medicina [es], Buenos Aires, 1944
 Germanic Bank of South America, Buenos Aires, 1928
 El Hogar Obrero Cooperative Housing [es], Buenos Aires, 1944
 Estadio Tomás Adolfo Ducó, Buenos Aires, 1949
 Hospital Británica [es], Buenos Aires, 1942
 Hospital Maternidad Infantil Ramón Sardá [es], Buenos Aires, 1935
 Hotel Moreno, Buenos Aires, 1929
 Kavanagh Building, Buenos Aires, 1936
 La Equitatavia del Plata Building [es], Buenos Aires, 1929
 La Unión Building [es], Buenos Aires, 1933
 Lavalle Street, Buenos Aires, 1923
 Mercado de Abasto [es], Buenos Aires, 1934
 Ministry of Public Works [es], Buenos Aires, 1936
 National City Bank of New York [es], Buenos Aires, 1929
 National Institute of Cinema and Audiovisual Arts, Buenos Aires, 1946
 NH City & Tower Hotel [es], Buenos Aires, 1931
 San Benito Abbey, Buenos Aires, 1920
 Shell Mex Building [es], Buenos Aires, 1936
 Teatro Broadway, Buenos Aires, 1930
 Teatro Empire [es], Buenos Aires, 1934
 Teatro Gran Rex, Buenos Aires, 1937
 Teatro Gran Rivadavia, Buenos Aires, 1949
 Teatro Metropolitan [es], Buenos Aires, 1936
 Teatro Ópera, Buenos Aires, 1936
 Volta Building [es], Buenos Aires, 1935

Buenos Aires Province 
source:
 Eustoquio Diaz Vélez Municipal Hospital, Rauch, Buenos Aires Province, 1936
 , Buenos Aires Province
 Cemetery, Balcarce, Buenos Aires Province, 1936
 Cemetery, Laprida, Buenos Aires Province, 1937
 Cemetery, Saldungaray, Buenos Aires Province, 1937
 Domingo Faustuni Sarmiento Municipal Park (gateway), Azul, 1937
 , Alberti, Buenos Aires Province, 1937
 , Buenos Aires Province, 1937
 Dr. Manuel B. Cabrera Municipal Hospital, Coronel Pringles, Buenos Aires Province, 1937
 Cemetery, Salliqueló, Buenos Aires Province, 1938
 Cemetery, Pilar, Buenos Aires Province, 1938
 , Buenos Aires Province, 1938
 Club Atlético, Pellegrini, Buenos Aires Province, 1938
 , Azul, Buenos Aires Province, 1938
 Escuela Normal Rural, Balcarce, Buenos Aires Province, 1938
 , La Plata, Buenos Aires Province, 1938
 Escuela Florentino Ameghino, La Plata, Buenos Aires Province, 1938
 Municipal Building, Chascomús, Buenos Aires Province, 1937
 Municipal Building, Guaminí, Buenos Aires Province, 1937
 Municipal Building, Laprida, Buenos Aires Province, 1937
 Municipal Building, Pellegrini, Buenos Aires Province, 1937
 Municipal Building, Rauch, Buenos Aires Province, 1937
 Municipal Building, Tornquist, Buenos Aires Province, 1937
 Municipal Building of Adolfo Alsina, Carhué, Buenos Aires Province, 1938
 Municipal Building of Alberti, Alberti, Buenos Aires Province, 1938
 Municipal Building Leandro N. Alem, Vedia, Buenos Aires Province, 1938
 Municipal Building, Lomas de Zamora, Buenos Aires Province, 1938
 Municipal Building, Coronel Pringles, Buenos Aires Province, 1940
 Municipal Delegation, Cuartel VII, Buenos Aires Province, 1936
 Municipal Delegation, Alberdi, Buenos Aires Province, 1937
 Municipal Delegation, Alem, Buenos Aires Province, 1937
 Municipal Delegation, Bonifacio, Buenos Aires Province, 1937
 Municipal Delegation, Casabas, Buenos Aires Province, 1937
 , Coronel Mom, Buenos Aires Province, 1937
 , Buenos Aires Province, 1937
 Municipal Delegation, El Dorado, Buenos Aires Province, 1937
 Municipal Delegation, Garré, Buenos Aires Province, 1937
 Municipal Delegation, San Agustín, Buenos Aires Province, 1937
 Municipal Delegation, San Jorge, Buenos Aires Province, 1937
 Municipal Delegation, Tres Picos, Buenos Aires Province, 1937
 Municipal Delegation de Escobar, Belén de Escobar, Buenos Aires Province, 1938
 Municipal Delegation, Miranda, Buenos Aires Province, 1938
 Municipal Delegation, Saldungaray, Buenos Aires Province, 1938
 Municipal Delegation, Tres Lomas, Buenos Aires Province, 1938
 Municipal Market, Saldungaray, Buenos Aires Province, 1937
 Plaza General José de San Martín, Pellegrini, Buenos Aires Province, 1937
 Slaughterhouse, Alem, Buenos Aires Province, 1937
 Slaughterhouse, Balcarce, Buenos Aires Province, 1937
 Slaughterhouse, Coronel Pringles, Buenos Aires Province, 1937
 Slaughterhouse, Guaminí, Buenos Aires Province, 1937
 Slaughterhouse, Saldungaray, Buenos Aires Province, 1937
 Slaughterhouse, Tornquist, Buenos Aires Province, 1937
 Slaughterhouse, Vedia, Buenos Aires Province, 1937
 Slaughterhouse, Cachari, Buenos Aires Province, 1937
 Slaughterhouse, Chillar, Buenos Aires Province, 1937
 Slaughterhouse, Villa Epecuén, Buenos Aires Province, 1937
 Slaughterhouse, Adolfo Gonzales, Buenos Aires Province, 1938
 Slaughterhouse, Azul, Buenos Aires Province, 1938
 Slaughterhouse, Tres Lomas, Buenos Aires Province, 1938
 Slaughterhouse, Salliqueló, Buenos Aires Province, 1938
 Slaughterhouse, Pellegrini, Buenos Aires Province, 1938
 Slaughterhouse, Pellegrini, Buenos Aires Province, 1938
 Plaza Juan Pascual Pringles, Colonel Pringles, Buenos Aires Province, 1939
 , Adolfo Gonzales Chaves, Buenos Aires Province, 1939
 , Adolfo Gonzales Chaves, Buenos Aires Province, 1939
 Colegio Michael Ham, Vicente López, 1951
 Emilio Canzani House, Mar del Pata, Buenos Aires Province, 1954

The Bahamas 
 Bahama Craft Centre, Nassau
 Wyndham Nassau Resort, Nassau, Bahamas

Barbados 
 SoCo Hotel, Bridgetown, Barbados
 Pirate's Inn, Christ Church, Barbados

Belize 
 Princess Cinema, Belize City, 1950s
 Wesley Methodist Church, Belize City, 1951

Bolivia 
 6259 La Plata, Oruro
 Autoridad de Supervisión del Sistema Financiero, Oruro
 Banco Nacional de Bolivia, Oruro
 Building at 17 Arenales, former house of Virreira family, Sucre
 Building at 48 Calvo, Sucre
 Carrera de Enfermería, Sucre
 Casa Comericial Schütt, Sucre
 Cine Gran Rex, Oruro
 Escuela Nacional de Maestros "Mariscal Sucre," Sucre
 Estación Presidente Aniceto Arce Train Station, Sucre, 1940
 Fiscalía General del Estado (formerly Banco Central de Bolivia), Sucre
 Tribunal Constitucional Plurinacional (Plurinational Constitutional Court), Sucre

Cochabamba 
 Cine Roxy, Cochabamba
 former Cine Victor, Cochabamba
 Colegio La Salle, Cochabamba
 Edificio Comité Cívico de Cochabamba, Cochabamba
 Escuela Militar de Sargentos del Ejército, Cochabamba
 Estadio Félix Capriles, Cochabamba, 1938

 Instituto de Investigaciones Antropológicas y Museo Arqueológico (former Central Bank of Bolivia), Cochabamba, 1951
 Iglesia de San Pedro, Cochabamba, 1961

La Paz 
 Avenida Argentina 1986, 1992, and 1994 La Paz
 Avenida Camacho 1209, 1389 and 1415, La Paz
 Avenida Mariscal Santa Cruz 1308 and 1311, La Paz
 Banco Bisa Agencia Camacho, Av. Camacho, La Paz
 , La Paz, 1946
 La Biblioteca Municipal de La Paz, La Paz, 1938
 Caja Nacional de Salud (National Health Fund), La Paz
 Calle C. R. Villalobos 1497, La Paz
 Cine Teatro Monje Campero, La Paz
 Club de la Paz, Av. Camacho, La Paz, 1942
 Edificio Krsul, Fondo Nacional de Inversión Productiva y Social offices, Av. Camacho, La Paz
 Edificio Luz de Alba, La Paz
 Eros Karaoke Club, La Paz
 Hotel Sagarnaga, La Paz
 Laboratorios Vita, La Paz
 Ministerio de Defensa, La Paz
 Ministerio de Desarrollo Productivo y Economía Plural, Av. Camacho, La Paz
 Ministerio de Desarollo Rural Y Tierras, Av. Camacho, La Paz
 Ministerio de Gobierno, Dirección General de Migración, Av. Camacho, La Paz
 Ministerio de Salud, La Paz
 Monoblock Building, Universidad Mayor de San Andrés, La Paz, 1947

Brazil 
 Cinema Olympia, Belém, 1912
 Lacerda Elevator, Salvador, Bahia, 1930
 , Porto Alegre, Rio Grande do Sul, 1930
 Instituto do Cacau, Salvador, Bahia, 1936
 , Três Lagoas, Mato Grosso do Sul, 1936
 Igreja de São Geraldo, Porto Alegre, Rio Grande do Sul, 1938
 Biblioteca Municipal Félix Araújo, Campina Grande, Paraíba, 1942
 , Belo Horizonte, 1943
 Casa do Baile, Pampulha, Belo Horizonte, 1943
 Edificio Sulacap, Salvador, Bahia, 1946

Goiânia, Goiás 
 Grande Hotel de Goiânia, Goiânia, 1935
 Cine Teatro Estrela, Goiânia, 1936
 Esmeraldas Palace, Attilio Corrêa Lima, Goiânia, 1937
 Coreto da Praça Cívica, Goiânia, 1942
 , Jorge Félix de Souza, Goiânia, 1942
 , Goiânia, 1946
 ,  Geraldo Duarte Passos, Goiânia, 1952

Rio de Janeiro 
source:
 , Rio de Janeiro, 1927
 , Rio de Janeiro, 1927
 Estádio São Januário, Rio de Janeiro, 1927
 Edificio Itaoca, Copababana, Rio de Janeiro, 1928
 , Rio de Janeiro, 1929
 Edifício Ypiranga, Rio de Janeiro, 1930
 Christ the Redeemer statue, Paul Landowski, 1931
 Edificio Guahy, Copacabana, Rio de Janeiro, 1932
 Edificio Itahy, Rio de Janeiro, 1932
 , Rio de Janeiro, 1933
 Edificio Mesbia, Rio de Janeiro, 1934
 Edifício Embaixador, Rio de Janeiro, 1935
 Edificio Alagoas, Copacabana, Rio de Janeiro, 1935
 Edifício Caxias, Rio de Janeiro, 1937
 , Ramos Rio de Janeiro, 1938
 , Rio de Janeiro, 1938
  Building, Rio de Janeiro, 1939
 Central do Brasil station, Rio de Janeiro, 1943
 , Cachambi, Rio de Janeiro, 1950
 Cine Irajá, Irajá, Rio de Janeiro, 1941
 , Vaz Lobo, Rio de Janeiro, 1941
 Edificio Amazonas, Copacabana, Rio de Janeiro
 Edificio Ceará, Copacabana, Rio de Janeiro
 Edifícios Comodoro, Solano e Ouro Preto, Rio de Janeiro
 Edificio Fabiao, Copacabana, Rio de Janeiro
 , Rio de Janeiro, 1929
 Edifício Mayapán, Rio de Janeiro, 1940
 Edificio Ophir, Copacabana, Rio de Janeiro
 Edificio Petronio, Copacabana, Rio de Janeiro
 Edificio Sylvia, Copacabana, Rio de Janeiro
  railway station, Realengo, Rio de Janeiro
  (St. Teresa Church), Rio de Janeiro
 Monumento Rodoviário da Rodovia Presidente Dutra, Rio de Janeiro, 1938
 , Rio de Janeiro, 1931
 Palacete São João do Rei, Flamengo, Rio de Janeiro, 1933
 , Christiano Stockler das Neves, Rio de Janeiro, 1942
 Palacio da Fazenda, Rio de Janeiro, 1928
 , Aparecida, Rio de Janeiro, 1946
 Teatro Carlos Gomes, Rio de Janeiro, 1931
 Teatro Dulcina & Cine Orly, Rio de Janeiro, 1935
 , Rio de Janeiro, 1934
  (Regional Labor Courts), Rio de Janeiro, 1936

São Paulo 
 Altino Arantes Building, São Paulo, 1947
 , São Paulo, 1934
 , São Paulo, 1938
 , São Paulo, 1944
 Edifício do Banco do Brasil, São Paulo, 1954
 Edifício Elizabeth, São Paulo, 1938
 , São Paulo
 , São Paulo, 1930
 Edifício Santa Victoria, São Paulo, 1930s
 Espacio Unibanco de Cinema, São Paulo, 1947
 Estádio Municipal Paulo Machado de Carvalho (Pacaembu Stadium), São Paulo, 1940
 Instituto Biológico, Mario Whately, São Paulo, 1928
 Mário de Andrade Library, São Paulo, 1942
 Monumento às Bandeiras, Victor Brecheret, São Paulo, 1954
 Pacaembu Stadium, São Paulo, 1940
 Teatro Santana, São Paulo, 1960
 s, São Paulo, 1940
 Viaduto do Chá (Tea viaduct), São Paulo, 1938

Canada 
 Confederation Building, St. John's, Newfoundland, 1960
 former Discovery Centre Building (originally Zellers department store), Halifax, Nova Scotia, 1939
 Dominion Public Building, Halifax, Nova Scotia, 1936
 Federal Building, Edmonton, Alberta, 1955
 Globe Theatre, Winnipeg, Manitoba
 Hotel Newfoundland, St. John's, Newfoundland and Labrador, 1926
 Maritime Life Building, Halifax, Nova Scotia, 1954
 Monarch Theatre, Medicine Hat, Alberta, 1920s
 National Research Foundation Building, Halifax, Nova Scotia, 1949
 Plaza Theatre, Calgary, Alberta, 1935
 Roblin Theatre, Roblin, Manitoba, 1939
 Roxy Theatre, Airdie, Alberta
Scotia Bank (formerly Bank of Nova Scotia) Headquarters, Halifax, 1931
 SilverCity St. Vital, Winnipeg, Manitoba
 Sovereign Building, Halifax, Nova Scotia
 Vogue Cinema, Sackville, New Brunswick, 1946

British Columbia 
 Bessborough Armory, Vancouver, 1932
 Burrard Street Bridge, Vancouver, 1932
 Capitol Theatre, Nelson, 1927
 Capitol Theatre, Port Hope, 1930
 Commodore Ballroom, Vancouver, 1929
 Dunbar Theatre, Vancouver, 1941
 Gotham Steakhouse, Vancouver, 1933
 Marine Building, (McCarter & Nairne), Vancouver, 1930
 Metro Theatre, Vancouver, 1941
 Prince Rupert City Hall, Prince Rupert, 1938
 Rio Theatre, Vancouver, 1938
 Royal Bank Tower, Vancouver, 1929
 Roxy Theatre, Revelstoke, 1905, 1937
 Sidney Roofing and Paper Company Ltd building, Granville Island, 1936
 St. James Anglican Church, Vancouver, 1937
 Stanley Industrial Alliance Stage, Vancouver, 1930
 Tidemark Theatre (formerly Van-Isle Theatre), Campbell River, 1947
 Vancouver City Hall, Townley & Matheson, Vancouver, 1936
 Vancouver Island Regional Library, Campbell River, 1947
 Vogue Theatre, Vancouver, 1941

Ontario 
source:
 545 Lake Shore Boulevard West, Toronto, 1927
 Ambassador Bridge, Windsor to Detroit, 1927
 Arcadian Court, The Bay Department Store 8th Floor, Toronto, 1929
 Automotive Building, Toronto, 1929
Bank of Montreal, Ottawa, 1930
 Bank of Nova Scotia, Toronto, 1951
 Balfour Building, Toronto, 1930s
 Bloor Collegiate Institute, Toronto, 1920
 Canada Building, Windsor, 1928
 Canada Permanent Trust Building, Toronto, 1930
 Central Post Office, Ottawa, 1939
 College Park Department Store Building, Toronto, 1930
 East and West Memorial Buildings, Ottawa, 1945
École Routhier, Ottawa, 1932
 Eglinton Theatre, Toronto, 1936
 Exhibition Place (Automotive Building, Bandshell, Hollywood Bowl, Horse Palace), Toronto, 1929–1936
 Gayety Theatre, Collingwood, 1928
 Hambly House, Hamilton, 1939
 Hamilton GO Centre train and bus station, Hamilton, 1933
Hardy Arcade, Ottawa, 1937
 Hart House Theatre, Toronto, 1919
 Hydro Electric Power Commission of Ontario, Toronto, 1935
Hydro Electric Power Commission Building, Ottawa, 1934
Hydro Electric Substation No 4., Ottawa
 Imperial Oil Centre for the Performing Arts, Sarnia, 1936
 Kingsway Theatre, Toronto, 1939
 Lawren Harris House, Toronto, 1930
 Maple Leaf Gardens, Ross and Macdonald, Toronto, 1931
 Metro Theatre, Toronto, 1938
 Michael Garron Hospital, Toronto, 1929
 Odeon Theatre, Sarnia, 1941
 Old Toronto Star Building, Toronto, 1929
 Old Walkerville Theatre, Windsor, 1918, 1930
 Paul Martin Sr. Building, Windsor, 1933
 Pigott Building, Hamilton, 1929
 Port Theatre, Cornwall, 1941
 Queen's Quay Terminal, Toronto, 1926
 R. C. Harris Water Treatment Plant, Toronto, 1941
 Radio City, Toronto, 1936
 Regent Gala Theatre, Toronto, 1927
 Roxy Theatres, Uxbridge
 Royal Edward Arms, Fort William, Thunder Bay, 1928
 Royal Ontario Museum, Toronto, 1914, 1932
 Seneca Queen Theatre, Niagara Falls, 1945
 Sir John A. Macdonald Building, Ottawa, 1930
 Spadina House (Spadina Museum: Historic House & Gardens), Toronto, 1912
 St. Michael's Hospital, Toronto, 1920
 Stanley Theatre (Stanley Industrial Alliance Stage), Vancouver, 1930
 Sterling Tower, Toronto, 1928
 Sunnyside Bus Terminal, Toronto, 1936
 Supreme Court of Canada, (Ernest Cormier), Ottawa, 1946
 Tip Top Tailors Building (Tip Top Lofts), Toronto, 1929
 Tivoli Theatre, Creston, 1938
 Tivoli Theatre, Hamilton, 1924
 Toronto Coach Terminal, Toronto, 1931
 Toronto Postal Station K, Murray Brown for Canada Post, Toronto, Ontario 1936
 Toronto Stock Exchange (now part of the Toronto-Dominion Centre), Toronto, 1936
 Town Tavern, Toronto, 1949
 Vernon Town Theatre, Vernon
 Victoria Building, Ottawa, 1928

Quebec 
 Aldred Building, Montreal, 1931
 Architects' Building, Montreal, 1931
 Atwater Market, Saint-Henri, Montreal, 1933
 Cinéma Le Château, Montreal, 1931
 Cinéma de Paris, Quebec City, 1948
 La Cité de l'Énergie theme park, Shawingan, 1911, 1928
Canadian Triumphal Arch, Trois-Rivières Cathedral, Trois-Rivières, 
 Clarendon Hotel, Old Quebec, Quebec City, 1927
 Complexe Les Ailes, Montreal, 1931
 Cormier House, Golden Square Mile, Montreal, 1931
 Eaton's Ninth Floor Restaurant is a copy of the huge Ile de France first class dining room (Jacques Carlu), Montreal, 1931
 Écomusée du fier monde museum, Montreal, 1920s
 Édifice Price (Price Building), Quebec City, 1931
 Empire Theatre, Quebec City
 Empress Theatre, Montreal, 1927
 Guaranteed Pure Milk bottle, Montreal, 1930
 Hanson Building, Montreal, 1928
 Hôpital de Verdun, Montreal, 1931
 Laurentian Hotel, Quebec, 1948
 Montreal Botanical Garden, Montreal, 1931
 Montreal Central Station, Montreal, 1943
 Montreal Star Building, Montreal, 1930
 Outremont Theatre, Outremont, Montreal, 1928
 Price Building (aka Édifice Price), Quebec City, Quebec 1931
 Saint-Esprit-de-Rosemont Church, Rosement-La Petite-Patrie, Montreal, 1933
 Saint-Jean-Berchmans Church, Rosement-La Petite-Patrie, Montreal, 1939
 Tramways Building, Montreal, 1928
 Université de Montréal central building (Ernest Cormier), Montreal 1940
 Verdun Natatorium, Verdun, 1930
 York Theatre, Montreal, 1938

Saskatchewan 
 Adilman Building, Saskatoon, Saskatchewan, 1921
 Broadway Theatre, Saskatoon, Saskatchewan, 1946
 Casino Regina, Regina, Saskatchewan, 1912, 1931
 Dominion Government Building, Regina, Saskatchewan
 Modern Press Building, Saskatoon, Saskatchewan, 1927
 Vogue Cinema, Sackville, New Brunswick, 1946
 Yorkton Armoury, Yorkton, Saskatchewan, 1939

Chile 
 , Ñuñoa, Santiago, 1927
 Biblioteca de Santiago (Santiago Library), Santiago, 1930s
  (Keller Street), Providencia, Santiago Region, 1925
 , Concepción, 1928
 Cine Hoyts (originally Cine Metro), Valparaíso, 1948
 Club Náutico Cavalca, Iquique
 Conjunto Freire, Concepción, 1935
 Conjunto Prat, Concepción, 1930
 Conjunto Virginia Opazo (group of houses), Barrio República, Santiago, 1944
 , Valparaíso, 1942
 Cuartel Central de Bombas (Central Fire Station), Talca
 , Valparaíso, 1946
 Edificio Sanitario FF.CC., Concepción, 1929
 , Valparaíso, 1928
 , Santiago, 1929
 , Santiago, 1923
 , Universidad de Chile, Santiago, 1938
 Instituto de Anatomía Patológica, Universidad de Concepción, Concepción, 1929
 Mercado Centenario, Iquique, 1930
 El Palacio de los Tribunales de Justicia, Valparaíso, 1939
 , Santiago, 1929
 , Independencia, Santiago Region, 1930
 Residential Metro, Concepción
 , Valparaíso, 1931
  (formerly the Baquedano Theatre), Santiago, 1931

Colombia 
 10-23 Calle 3, San Agustín, Huila
 13-31 Calle 4, San Agustín, Huila
 Balcón del Campestre, Cali
 Café Boulevard, Cali
 Casino, San Agustín, Huila
 Cine Teatro Boyacá, Tunja
 Cine Teatro Quiminza, Tunja
 Edificio Cooservicios, Tunja
 Edificio Jorge Garces Borrero, Cali
 Edificio Salomón Ganem, Cartagena, 1948
 Edificio Ulpiano Lloreda, Cali
 Gobernación del Magdalena (formerly the Hotel Tayrona), Santa Marta, 1948
 Gymnasium, Mocoa
 Hotel Astoria Real, Cali
 Hotel Azor, Cali
 Hotel Caribe, Cartagena
 Hotel Imperio, Cali
 Hotel Nutibara, Medellín, 1945
 Museo de Antioquia (formerly office of the Mayor), Medellín, 1937
 , Manizales, 1951
 , Tunja, 1939
 Teatro Cultural, Tunja
 Teatro Lido, Medellín, 1947
 Teatro Santa Marta, Santa Marta, 1942

Barranquilla 
 Barranquilla Calle Real, Barranquilla
 , Barranquilla, 1921
 Casa Manuel Carrerá, Barranquilla, 1940
 Centro Comercial Avianca (formerly the Scadta Building), Barranquilla, 1935
 , Barranquilla, 1939
 Cristobal Colón Theatre, Barranquilla
 Edificio Eckardt, Barranquilla, 1939
 Edificio Garcia apartments, Barranquilla, 1930s
 Edificio Hane, Barranquilla, 1942
 Hotel Roxy, Barranquilla
 Romelio Martínez Stadium, Barranquilla, 1934
 Shaare Sedek Synagogue, Barranquilla, 1947
 , Barranquilla, 1947

Bogotá 
 Biblioteca Nacional de Colombia, Bogotá, 1933
 , Bogotá, 1933
 , Bogotá, 1933
 Alberto Sanz Building, Bogotá, 1936
 Clínica Dr. Restrepo Building, Bogotá, 1936
 , Bogotá, 1936
 , Bogotá, 1938
 , Bogotá, 1938
 Teatro Mogador, Bogotá, 1938
 Teatro de la Media Torta, Bogotá, 1938
 Teatro Roxy (Lux), Bogotá, 1940s
 Sotomayor Building, Bogotá, 1940s
 Hotel Casa Deco La Concordia, Bogotá, 1940s
 House - Calle 12, Bogotá, 1940s
 House - Calle 61, Bogotá, 1940s
 House - Calle ?, Bogotá, 1940s
 Colegio San Bartolomé La Merced, Bogotá, 1941
 Córdoba Building, Bogotá, 1945
 San Carlos Hospital, Bogotá, 1947
 Escuela Taller de Bogotá, Bogotá
 Hostal Casa Quevedo, Bogotá
 Hotel Zaragona, Bogotá
 Teatro Egipto, Bogotá, 1950s

Costa Rica 
 Banco Nacional de Costa Rica, San José, 1948
 former Cine Líbano, San José, 1924
 Correo Central (Edificio Herdocia y Edificio Fischel), San José
 Edificio Herdocia, San José, 1945
 Gimnasio del Colegio San Luis Gonzaga (High school gymnasium), San José
 Gran Hotel (Costa Rica), San José, 1930
  San José, 1943
 Hospital San Juan de Dios, San José
 Hotel Kekoldi, San José
 , San José
 Municipal Theater, Alajuela
 El Progreso Panadería, San José
 former Teatro Palace (now Food Mall), San José, 1930s

Cuba 
 Agricultural Market - Mercado Agropecuario "La Plaza," Santiago de Cuba
Camagüey Hotel (formerly Ignacio Agramonte Provincial Museum), La Vigia, Camagüey, 1948
Carilda Oliver House, Matanzas
Casa Garay (Guayabita chocolate factory), Pinar del Rio, 1931
Centro Cultural Alkázar, La Caridad, Camagüey
Centro Escolar, Holguín
Cine Carmen, Ciego de Avila, Camagüey, 1945
Cine Frexes, Holguín
Cine-Teatro Luisa, Cienfuegos, 1911, 1931
Colegio de Champagnat, La Vigia, Camagüey, 1941
Convent of the Servants of Mary chapel, Cienfuegos, 1940
Enseñanza Politecnica Holguín (and garage and cafeteria), Holguín
Escuela Profesional de Comercio, Santiago de Cuba
History Museum (formerly Moncada Barracks), Santiago de Cuba
Hospital Clínico Quirúrgico Docente Ambrosio Grillo Portuondo, Santiago de Cuba
Independent Order of Oddfellows (Independiente Orden de Oddfellows), Cienfuegos, 1924
Methodist Church, Baracoa
National Medical College, Holguín
Santa Clara Libre Hotel, Santa Clara
Teatro Alkázar, Sagua la Grande, Las Villas Province, 1936
Teatro Cardenas, Cardenas, Matanzas
Templo Bautista Nazaret (Baptist church), Cienfuegos, 1936
Tomb of José Martí, Santa Ifigenia Cemetery, Santiago de Cuba
Wenceslao Infante Theater, Holguín, 1948

Havana 
Angelina Espina house, Havana
Bacardi Building (Havana), Havana, 1930
 Casa de Julia Tarafa, Havana
 Casa de las Americas, Havana
Casa de la Amistad (formerly the Catalina de Laza mansion), Vedado, Havana
Casa Particular, Habana Vieja, Havana
Casa Quinlana apartments, Vedado, Havana
 Catalina de Laza mausoleum in the Cristobal Colón Cemetery, Havana
Cine La Edad de Oro (formerly Cine Santa Catalina), Mendoza, Havana, 1946
Cine Metropolitan, Ampliación de Almendares, Havana, 1949
Cine Moderno, Jesus del Monte, Havana, 1929
former Cine Reina, Havana
Cine-Teatro América (in the Rodriquez Vazquez building) Habana Vieja, Havana, 1941
Cine-Teatro Fausto, Habana Vieja, Havana, 1938
 Cine-Teatro Sierra Maestra, Rancho Boyeros, Havana, 1932
Cinema Arenal, Playa, Havana, 1945
Club de Cantineros (Cuban Bartender's Club), Havana
College of Architects (Colegio Nacional de Arquitectos de Cuba), Vedado, Havana, 1926
Cuervo-Rubio Apartments, Vedado, Havana
Edificio Mina, Havana
Edificio Traiángulo apartments, Vedado, Havana
 El País newspaper building, Havana
Emilio Vasconcelos residence, Vedado, Havana
 Francisco Argüelles House, Miramar, Havana, 1927
Gonzalo Arostegui Residence, Kohly, Havana
Hilda Sarra House, Marianao, Havana, 1936
Hospital Materno Infantil Eusebio Hernández (Maternidad Obrera), Havana, 1939
Hotel Nacional de Cuba, Havana
 Hotel Palacio Cueto, Havana
José Martí Memorial, Havana, 1958
La Moderna Poesia bookstore, Old Havana, Havana, 1939
 López Serrano Building, Vedado, Havana, 1932
Manuel Lopez Chavez residence, Kohly, Havana
 Maternidad Obrera de Marianao, Havana, 1941
Mercedes L. Navarro House, Vedado, Havana
 Miguel de Soto Methodist Church, Havana
 Modelo Brewery, Havana, 1948
Ricardo Hernández Beguerie House, Miramar, Havana
 Sloppy Joe's Bar, Havana, Havana
Solimar Building, Havana, 1944
Solomon Kalmanowitz House, Miramar, Havana
Tabacalera Insurance Company building, Havana

Curaçao 
 , Willemstad, 1932
 Saint Tropez Ocean Club, Willemstad

Dominican Republic 
 Banco de Reservas de la República Dominicana, Santo Domingo, 1941 
 Catedral de San Felipe Apóstol (Cathedral of St. Philip the Apostle), Puerto Plata, 1956
 Columbus Lighthouse, Santo Domingo Este, designed 1931, built 1986
 El Conde, Santo Domingo
 Luna's Bed and Breakfast (Formerly the Foreigners Club) Colonial Zone, Santo Domingo, 1935
 Washington Institute, Parque Independencia, Santo Domingo

El Salvador 
 Centro de Gangas, Chalchuapa, 1930s
 De Sola Building, San Salvador, 1930s
 Estadio Jorge "Mágico" González, San Salvador, 1932
 Consultorio Médico San Vicente de Paul, San Salvador, 1940s
 Sociedad de Empleados de Comercio, San Salvador, 1940s
 Bar La Praviana, San Salvador, 1940s
 Banco de Londres & Montreal, San Salvador, 1940s
 Hotel Centro Histórico, San Salvador, 1940s
 F.A. Dalton & Co Building, San Salvador, 1940s
 Vidri Building, San Salvador, 1940s
 Lourdes Building, San Salvador, 1940s
 Pan Lido Building, San Salvador, 1940s
 General Electric Building, San Salvador, 1940s
 José Gadala María Building, San Salvador, 1940s
 La Constancia Building, San Salvador, 1940s
 La Mariposa Building, San Salvador, 1940s
 La Cafetalera Building, San Salvador, 1940s
 Goldtree Liebes Building, San Salvador, 1940
 Monumento al Divino Salvador del Mundo, San Salvador, 1942
 Casino Building, San Salvador, 1944
 Regalado Building, San Salvador, 1948
 Veiga Building, San Salvador, 1948
 Dueñas Building, San Salvador, 1948-1986
 Julia L. de Duke Building, San Salvador, 1949
 Comercial Building, San Salvador, 1950s
 San Francisco Building, San Salvador, 1950-1986
 , San Salvador, 1950
 Central Building, San Salvador, 1954
 Auto Palace, San Salvador, 1955
 Hospital de Maternidad, San Salvador, 1954-2019
 Gimnasio Nacional José Adolfo Pineda, San Salvador, 1956
 Cine Apolo, San Salvador, 1966

Ecuador 
 Banco Nacional de Fomento, Latacunga
 Clínica del Seguro Social, Latacunga
 Colegio La Salle, Latacunga
 Colegio San Gabriel, Quito
 , Guayaquil
 Edificio La Previsora Centro, Quito, 1935
 Estadio El Ejido, Quito, 1932
 Estadio Municipal, Otavalo
 Fiscalía Provincial del Azuay (Prosecutor's Office), Cuenca
 Hostal Residencia Sucre, Quito
 Hotel Rosím, Latacunga
 Instituto Ecuatoriano de Seguridad Social, Cuenca
 Latacunga Train Station, Latacunga, 1941
 Mercado 10 de Noviembre, Guaranda
 Provincial Government Building, Loja
 Teatro Bolívar, Quito, 1933
 Train Station, Latacunga, 1941

Guatemala 
 192-212 15 avenida A, 2-28 zona1, Quezaltenango-Xela
 Club Tennis Quetzaltenango-Xela, Quetzaltenango-Xela
 Edificio Gutiérrez, Quetzaltenango-Xela
 El Monumento a Justo Rufino Barrios, Quetzaltenango-Xela

Guatemala City 
 , Guatemala, 1957
 former Cine Fox, Guatemala City
 Cine Lux (now ), Guatemala City, 1936
 Cine Tikal, Guatemala City
 , Guatemala City, 1955
 Crédito Hipotecario Nacional, Guatemala City
 Edificio Colon, Guatemala City
 Edificio Engel, Guatemala City, 1950
 Edificio Fogel, Guatemala City, 1937
 Edificio La Perla, Guatemala City, 1927
 Edificio Orriols, Guatemala City
 Edificio Venus, Guatemala City
 Hotel Fuentes, Guatemala City
 Imprenta Hispania, Centro Histórico, Guatemala City, 1927
 Mercado La Palmita, Guatemala City
 Museo de Historia Natural, Guatemala City, 1950
 , Guatemala City, 1931, 1951

Honduras 
 Alcaldía Municipal (city hall), León, 1942
 Cine Colombia, San Pedro Sula, 1935
 Cine El Hispano (formerly Cine Apolo), Comayagüela, 1934, 1944
 Empresa Nacional de Energía Eléctrica, Tegucigalpa
 Hotel Art Deco Beach, La Ceiba
 Palacio Municipal, San Pedro Sula, 1940
 Plaza de la Cultura (formerly the Instituto José Trinidad Reyes), San Pedro Sula, 1940s

Mexico 
 600 Calle Hermenegildo Galeana, Ciudad Obregón, Sonora
 , Saltillo, Coahuila, 1933
 Av. José María Morelos 600, Centro, Oaxaca, 1924
 Caja Popular Mexicana, Murguía Street, Centro, Oaxaca
 Centro Escolar Revolución, Ciudad Juárez, Chihuahua, 1939
 former Cine Reforma, Puebla, 1939
 Cine Roble, Tijuana
 Cine Zaragoza, Tijuana, 1944
 Coliseo Cinema, Puebla, 1940
 Escuela Primaria General Ángel Flores (elementary school), Culiacán, Sinaloa, 1948
 Estadio Revolución (Baseball stadium), Torreón, Coahuila, 1932
 Expendio Tradición restaurant, Oaxaca
 Mercado Juárez, Juárez, Chihuahua
 , Janitzio Island, Pátzcuaro, Michoacán, 1933
  (Clock Tower), Acaxochitlán, Hidalgo, 1932

Guadalajara 
 502 Mezquitán, Centro, Guadalajara, 1940s
 Alemania 1285, Moderna, Guadalajara, 1920s
 Casa Fayette hotel, Guadalajara, 1940s
 Centro Escolar Basilio Vadillo, Guadalajara
 former Cine Obregón, Oblatos, Guadalajara, 1948
 Cinepolis (formerly Teatro Alameda), Guadalajara, 1942
 former Cine Real (now commercial/retail), Jardines de San Francisco, Guadalajara, 1960
 Cine Roxy, Guadalajara, 1937
 Colectivo restaurant, Guadalajara, 1940
 Coronel Calderón 526 – Casa Cordero, Retiro, Guadalajara, 1930s
 Emerson 74, Colonia Americana, Guadalajara, 1935
 Frías 345, 349, Santa Teresita, Guadalajara, 1940s
 Hotel Alameda, Guadalajara
 José Guadalupe Zuno 2103, 2117, 2141, Colonia Lafayette, Guadalajara
 LArVa (Laboratorio de Arte Variedades, formerly Cine Variedades), Guadalajara, 1940
 Manzano 392, Mexicaltzingo, Guadalajara
 Nuestra Senora del Sagrado Corazon church, Guadalajara
 Pedro Moreno 102 – Edificio Carballo, Colonia Americana, Guadalajara
 Pedro Moreno 1740, Colonia Americana, Guadalajara, 1938
 Penitenciaria 22, Colonia Americana, Guadalajara
 Plaza Alameda (formerly Teatro Alameda), Guadalajara, 1942
 San Felipe 316, Centro, Guadalajara
 Simón Bolívar 326, Obrera, Guadalajara, 1938

Mérida 
 Casa Kaan, Centro, Mérida, Yucatán
 Casa Nacira, Mérida, Yucatán
 Edificio Las Monjas, Mérida, Yucatán
 Edificio la Nacional, Mérida, Yucatán
 Estacionamiento Alcázar (parking garage, formerly Cine Alcázar), Mérida, Yucatán
 Facultad de Medicina, Universidad Autónoma de Yucatán, Mérida, Yucatán
 Lux Perpetua Art Centre, Itzimná, Mérida, Yucatán 
 Mega Elektra Cantarell Merida commercial building, Mérida, Yucatán
 Teatro Armando Manzanero (formerly Cine Mérida), Mérida, Yucatán

Mexico City 
 Abelardo L. Rodríguez Market, Mexico City, 1934
 Ámsterdam Avenue, Condesa, Mexico City, 1920s
 Anahuac Building, Colonia Roma, Mexico City, 1932
 Apartamentos Tissot, Condesa, Mexico City
 Avenida 16 de Septiembre no.39 commercial building, Mexico City
 Basurto Building, Condesa, Mexico City, 1945
 Centro Cultural Bella Época (Cine Lido), Condesa, Mexico City, 1942
 , Colonia San Rafael, Mexico City, 1949
 Centrocel Teresa (formerly Cine Teresa), Mexico City, 1942
 Colonia Condesa, a neighborhood in Mexico City, including most buildings and Parque México (Francisco Serrano, 1939–1942)
 , Mexico City, 1934
 Cosmos Building, Centro Historico, Mexico City
 Edificio Casas Jardines, Condesa, Mexico City, 1930
 Edificio Guardiola, Cuauhtémoc, Mexico City, 1947
 Edificio El Moro, Loteria Nacional (National Lottery Building), Cuauhtémoc, Mexico City
 Edificio La Nacional, Sears headquarters. Mexico City, 1937
 Edificio Rosa, Condesa, Mexico City, 1935
 Edificio San Antonio, Condesa, Mexico City
 , Tacubaya, Mexico City, 1930
 , Jai Alai House, Concerts & Casino, Mexico City, 1929
 Hippodrome Hotel (formerly ),Condesa, Mexico City, 1931
 Lux Building, Condesa, Mexico City, 1931
 , Condesa, Mexico City, 1932
 Mexico City Mexico Temple, Mexico City, 1983
 , Mexico City, 1940
 , Mexico City, 1964
 Mother's Monument (Monument to Motherhood), Mexico City, 1949
 Monumento a la Revolución, Mexico City, 1938
 Museo de Arte Popular (formerly a fire station), Mexico City, 1927
 Niza Building, Condesa, Mexico City, 1934
 Orfeon Theater, Colonia Roma, Mexico City, 1938
 Palacio de Bellas Artes (the opera house), Mexico City, 1904, 1934
 Palacio Chino, Mexico City, 1940
 Palacio de Correos de México, Mexico City, 1907, 1950s
 El Parque Building, Condesa, Mexico City, 1935
 Parque México (Parque San Martín), Mexico City, 1927
 , Polanco, Mexico City, 1938
 , Condesa, Mexico City, 1930
 Plaza Popocatépetl, Mexico City, 1927
 Rio de Janeiro, Colonia Roma, Mexico City, 1930
 Roxy Building, Condesa, Mexico City, 1934
 Saint Augustine House, Mexico City, 1924
 San Martín Building, Condesa, Mexico City, 1931
 , Mexico City, 1943
 Telmex building (Teléfonos de México), Centro, Mexico City
 Victoria Building, Condesa, Mexico City
 Viena Building, Condesa, Mexico City

Monterrey 
 Edificio de Correos, Monterey, Nueovo León, 1930
 Escuela Primaria "Presidente Calles", Monterey, Nueovo León,1942
 Hospital Universitario "Dr. José Eleuterio González", Monterey, Nueovo León,1943
 former Palacio Federal, Palacio de Correos, Monterey, Nueovo León, 1928

Nicaragua 
 Alcaldía Municipal (City Hall), León, 1935–42
 Montebrisa Boutique Hotel, Matagalpa
 La Colonia Supermarket (Teatro Perla), Matagalpa

Panama 
 Banco Nacional de Panamá, Panama City
 Building 104 - Barracks, Panama City, 1933
 , Panama City
 Casco Viejo Neighborhood, Panama City
 former Duque family house/, Panama City
 Fire Station (Cuartel de Bomberos de Colón), Colón
 Hospital Amador Guerrero, Colón
 , Panama City, 1929
 Teatro Balboa, Panama City, 1946-1950
 Teatro Tropical, Panama City, 1972

Paraguay 
 former Bank of Paraguay, Asunción, 1944
 Casa Almeida Huerta, Asunción
 Casa Cubas, Asunción
 Casa Martino, Asunción
 Casa Pessolani, Asunción
 Casa Sacarello, Asunción
 Casa Scavone, Asunción
 Edificio Marcopolo, Asunción

Peru 
source:
 500 Jirón Colón at Paseo Pizarro, Trujillo
 Jerusalén 516, Arequipa
 Mercaderes 120, Arequipa
 Compañía de Bomberos Arequipa 19, Arequipa
 Colegio San Francisco, Arequipa
 Santa Catalina 217, Arequipa
 Portal de Flores 131, Arequipa
 El Ekeko, Arequipa
 Carlos Llosa 201B, Arequipa
 Carlos Llosa 201, Arequipa
 Angamos 211, Arequipa
 Jerusalén 615, Arequipa

Lima 
 Aldabas Building, 1931
 Centro Commercial Guizado.Hnos (former toy department of Oeschle department store)
 Cine Alfonso Ugarte (formerly Cine Ritz), late 1930s
 Compania Peruana de Teléfonos (Peruvian Telephone Company Building), Giron Anonio Miroquesada, 1929
 Fire Station # 3
 Gildermeister Building, 1930
 Jesus Nazareno Building (now McDonald's)
 Radio Nacional de Perú
 Restaurant De Buen Sabor
 Santa Rosa Building, 1931
 Teatro Británico
 Notaria Benavides
 Teatro Marsano
 Parroquia San Vicente de Paul
 Mercado de Surquillo, 1940
 Grau 988
 Inka Farma Grau
 Colina 102
 Bodega Nakatomo
 Libertadores 355
 Libertadores 359-365
 Libertadores 455
 Libertadores 674
 Vanderghen 384
 Manuel Fuentes 307
 1100 La Paz
 1116 La Paz
 200 28 de Julio
 Quinta Bolognesi 680-690
 Bolognesi 430
 La Preferida
 SBS Libreria Internacional
 Arequipa 4100
 Los Angeles 123-149
 Inca Garcilaso de la Vega 1123
 Camana 286
 Callao 161
 Puno 199
 Arenales 415
 Republica de Chile 311
 Paraguay 478
 Arequipa 3966
 Arequipa 4446
 Atahualpa 650
 Quinta Gral Borgoño 310
 Carlos Acosta 160
 Manuel Fuentes 307
 Bolognesi 277
 Federico Villareal 395
 Tarapca 130
 Arica 154
 Conquistadores 489
 Conquistadores 349
 Conquistadores 125
 Bolivia 666
 Arica 250
 Fanning 479
 Fanning 529
 Fanning 625
 2398 Petit Thours
 1990 Petit Thours
 1096 Carabaya
 Edificio Aurich
 Ministerio de Relaciones Exteriores
 Tambo de Belen
 Hospital Militar
 Aeroestacion Limatambo, 1947
 Hospital Obrero de Lima, 1941
 Edificio Buque
 Piura 575
 Chiclayo 229
 Coronel Inclán 494
 Coronel Inclán 484
 Dos de Mayo 689-699
 Arica 110-116
 Groomers Miraflores
 Jorge Chavez 294
 Jorge Chavez 284
 Jose Galvez 698
 Jose Galvez 671
 Jose Galvez 685
 Av. Brasil 1535
 Piura 436
 Av. Arequipa 2932
 Cine Opera
 Monumento Fermín Tangüis, Parque de la Reserva
 Parque de la Reserva
 Grau 405
 Porta 585
 Cordontec
 Teatro Roma
 Iglesia Cristiana Fuente de Gracia
 Carlos Tenaud 147-169
 Colon 380
 Colon 391
 Dos de Mayo 864
 Fanning 205
 Fanning 219
 Fanning 410
 Fanning 408
 Fanning 561
 Fanning 426
 Fanning 424
 Fanning 420
 Cantuarias 251
 Santa Teresita del Niño Jesus
 Escuela Militar de Chorrillos
 La Candelaria
 Metro Ovalo Balta
 Balta 105
 Progreso 10
 Progreso 18
 Torres Paz 226
 San Martin 298
 Ministerio de Salud, 1939
 Cine City Hall, 1946
 Iglesia Nuestra Senora de los Desamparados, 1945
 Edificio Tacna, 1949
 Edificio Ferrand, 1947
 Edificio La Fenix, 1948
 Edificio Raffo, 1938
 Mercado Central del Callao
 Colegio Militar Leoncio Prado
 Plaza Grau, 1946
 Plaza Jorge Chavez
 Reducto 922
 Reducto 936
 Lampa 1021

Puerto Rico 
source:
 Aguayo Aldea Vocational High School, Caguas Pueblo, 1939
Archivo Histórico Municipal (City Historical Archives), Mayagüez
Banco Popular de Puerto Rico, San Juan, 1938
Cámara de Comercio de Puerto Rico (formerly a branch of the Federal Land Bank of Baltimore), San Juan, 1926
Ceiba Fire Station, Ceiba, 1954
Jacinto Lopez Martinez Grammar School, Dorado, 1925
Maximiliano Merced Fire Station, Aguas Buenas, 1955
Mayagüez Main Post Office, Mayagüez, Puerto Rico, 1935
Oficina de Telégrafo y Teléfono, Guaynabo Pueblo, 1948
Plaza del Mercado de Manatí, Manatí Pueblo, 1925
Río Piedras State Penitentiary, Río Piedras, Puerto Rico, 1933
Teatro Calimano, Guayama
Teatro Yagüez, Mayagüez, Puerto Rico, 1921
Yabucoa Fire Station, Yabucoa, 1943

Ponce 
Beatriz Apartments, Ponce Pueblo, Ponce, 1943
Cementerio Católico San Vicente de Paul, Ponce, Puerto Rico
Club Náutico de Ponce (Ponce Yacht and Fishing Club), Ponce, 1941
Concha Acústica de Ponce (Acoustic Shell), Cuarto, Ponce, 1956
Mercado de las Carnes, Ponce, Puerto Rico, 1926
Museo Francisco "Pancho" Coimbre, Ponce, Puerto Rico
 Ponce Creole, Ponce, 1920s
 Plaza del Mercado de Ponce, Ponce, Puerto Rico, 1863, 1941
 Teatro Argel (now La Nueva Victoria bakery), Segundo, Ponce, 1940
Teatro Bélgica, Cuarto, Ponce, 1940
Teatro Fox Delicias, Segundo, Ponce, Puerto Rico, 1931
Teatro Hollywood, Primero, Ponce, 1930s
Teatro Miramar, Playa, Ponce, 1940s
Teatro Rex, Sexto, Ponce, 1930s
Teatro Rívoli, Tercero, Ponce, 1909
Teatro Universal, Segundo, Ponce, 1930s
Teatro Victoria, Segundo, Ponce, 1930s

San Juan 
 Auditorio Salvador Brau, San Juan, 1949
 Banco Popular Building, Antiguo, San Juan, 1939
Department of Agriculture Building, Santurce, San Juan, 1941
Department of Agriculture Autoridad de Tierras building, Santurce, San Juan
 Edificio Aboy "Le Faro," Santurce, San Juan, 1937
Edificio del Telégrafo, Santurce, San Juan, 1947
 El Falansterio de Puerta de Tierra apartments, San Juan Antiguo, Puerto Rico
 Figueroa Apartments, Santurce, San Juan, 1935
 Martín Peña Bridge, San Juan, Puerto Rico, 1939
 Miami Building, San Juan, Puerto Rico, 1936
Normandie Hotel, San Juan, Puerto Rico, 1942
Telegraph Building, Santurce, San Juan, Puerto Rico
University High School, Río Piedras, San Juan, 1939
U.S. Post Office Fernández Juncos, Santurce, San Juan

Suriname 
 , Paramaribo, 1948

Trinidad & Tobago 
 Citigroup Building, San Fernando, Trinidad and Tobago
 Police Administration Building, San Fernando, Trinidad and Tobago
 Standards Building, San Fernando, Trinidad and Tobago
 Treasury Building, Port-of-Spain, 1938

United States

Uruguay 
source:
 Artigas Building, Montevideo, 1940
 Ateneo Popular, Montevideo, 1925
 Banco de la Caja Obrera, Montevideo
 Barella apartments, Montevideo
 Bar España, Montevideo
 Cabildo Galería de Arte, Montevideo
 Calle Juan Carlos Gomez 1388, Montevideo, 1931
 , Montevideo, 1925
 Centro de Almaceneros Minoristas, Montevideo
 Centro de Fotografía de Montevideo (Photography Center, formerly Bazar Mitre), Montevideo, 1931
 Cine Ambassador, Montevideo
 Cine Radio City, Montevideo, 1937
 Cine Trocadero, Montevideo, 1945
 Comando General de la Armada, Montevideo
 Don Boutique Hôtel, Montevideo
 Edificio Centenario, Montevideo
 Edificio de la Dirección Nacional de Aduanas (Customs Building), Montevideo, 1923
 Edificio Goyret, Montevideo
 Edificio Magallanes, Montevideo
 , Montevideo, 1941
 Edificio San José, Montevideo
 Estadio Centenario, Montevideo, 1930
 Faculdade de Medicina, Montevideo
 Galeria Florida, Montevideo
 Garaje Cerrito, Montevideo
 Hospital de Clínicas, Montevideo
 Hotel Aramaya, Montevideo
 Hotel Bristol, Carrasco, 1925
 Hotel Don, Mercado del Puerto, Montevideo, 1929
 , restaurant Montevideo, 1932
 Lapido Building, Montevideo, 1933
 Lux Building, Montevideo
 El Mástil Building, Pocitos, Montevideo, 1935
 McLean Building, Montevideo, 1931
  (Tile Museum), Montevideo, 1931
 , Montevideo, 1929
 Palacio Maggiolo, Montevideo
 Palacio Rinaldi, Montevideo, 1929
 Palacio Salvo, Montevideo, 1928
 Parma Building, Montevideo
 Plaza Independencia area, Montevideo
 National Police of Uruguay, Montevideo
 Proamar Building, Montevideo, 1940
 La Ronda Cafe, Montevideo
 Tapié Building, Montevideo, 1934
 Templo Adventista, Montevideo
 Velódromo Municipal de Montevideo, Montevideo

Venezuela

Barquisimeto 
 El Manteco Market, Barquisimeto, 1936
 Bella Vista Market, Barquisimeto, 1936
 Altagracia Market, Barquisimeto, 1936
 Municipal Slaughterhouse, Barquisimeto, 1938
 Embotelladora Astor, Barquisimeto, 1938
 Sr. Soteldo Building, Barquisimeto, 1940s
 Cine Rialto, Barquisimeto, 1943
 Cine Imperio, Barquisimeto, 1943
 Bolívar Building , Barquisimeto, 1940s
 Studebaker Building, Barquisimeto, 1948 
 El Tocuyo Building , Barquisimeto, 1949

Caracas 

Public & Private Works
 Garaje Bolívar, Caracas, 1927?
 Almacenes El Pan Grande, Caracas, 1927-1940s
 Casa Belga Building, Caracas, 1928
 Cine El Dorado, Caracas, 1929
 Cine Bolívar, Caracas, 1929
 Slaughterhouse Petare, Caracas, 1930s-1937
 Jefatura Civil Parroquia Santa Teresa, Caracas, 1930-1952
 Teatro Pimentel, Caracas, 1930
 , Caracas, 1931
 Banco Agrícola y Pecuario, Caracas, 1931
 Pabellón del Hipódromo Nacional de El Paraíso, Caracas, 1931
 Teatro Caracas, Caracas, 1932
 Porta Astas de Campo Alegre, Caracas, 1932
 Palacio de la Gobernación, Caracas, 1934
 Ministerio de Fomento, Caracas, 1935
 Club Alemán, Caracas, 1935
 Palacio de Educación, Caracas, 1936
 Cine Rex, Caracas, 1936
 Cine Continental, Caracas, 1936
 Meat Market El Conde, Caracas, 1936-1950s
 Cuartel Central de Bomberos, Caracas, 1937-1952
 Hospital Militar y Naval, Caracas, 1937
 Maternidad Concepción Palacios, Caracas, 1938
 Sanatorio Antituberculoso El Algodonal, Caracas, 1939
 Escuela Experimental de Venezuela, Caracas, 1939
 Escuela Gran Colombia, Caracas, 1939
 Teatro Cine Ávila, Caracas, 1939
 Teatro Catia, Caracas, 1940
 Teatro Boyacá, Caracas, 1940-1969
 Zingg Building, Caracas, 1940
 Museo de Ciencias Naturales (Facade & Starcaise), Caracas, 1940 
 Colegio San Ignacio, Caracas, 1940
 Veroes Building, Caracas, 1940
 Eugenio Mendoza & Cía Sucrs Office Building, Caracas, 1940
 Planta Embotelladora de Pepsi, Caracas, 1940
 Cine America, Caracas, 1940-1969
 Cine Roxy, Caracas, 1940-1960
 Cine El Encanto, Caracas, 1940s
 Cine Granada, Caracas, 1940s
 Cine Plaza, Caracas, 1940s
 Cine Lux, Caracas, 1940s
 Cervecería Caracas Building, Caracas, 1940s
 Galerías Perico Building, Caracas, 1940s
 Galileo Building, Caracas, 1940s
 Panificadora Building, Caracas, 1940s
 Workshop Building, Caracas, 1940s
 Workshop Building, Caracas, 1940s
 Capilla Jesús, María y José, Caracas, 1940s
 Colegio José Ramón Camejo, Caracas, 1940s
 Las Acacias Bridge, Caracas, 1941
 Las Mercedes Bridge, Caracas, 1941
 Cine Hollywood, Caracas, 1941
 Pasaje Junín Building, Caracas, 1942-1948
 Cine Jardines, Caracas, 1943-1980
 Cine Royal, Caracas, 1943
 Cine Baby, Caracas, 1943
 Cine Rialto, Caracas, 1943-2010
 Teatro Alameda, Caracas, 1943
 Las Mercedes Building, Caracas, 1943
 Cine Apolo, Caracas, 1944-1983
 Nº22 Building, Caracas, 1944
 Hotel Waldorf, Caracas, 1944
 Mohedano Gas Station, Caracas, 1944-1950
 Victor Mendozza Building, Caracas, 1945
 Puente República Building, Caracas, 1945
 La Francia Building, Caracas, 1946
 Teatro Las Acacias, Caracas, 1946
 Manhattan Building, Caracas, 1946
 Phelps Building, Caracas, 1946
 Central Bank of Venezuela Building, Caracas, 1946-1960
 Hotel Nacional, Caracas, 1947
 Teatro El Pinar, Caracas, 1947
 Centro Médico de Caracas, Caracas, 1947
 Chacaito Gas Station, Caracas, 1948-1955
 Bank of Venezuela El Recreo Agency Building, Caracas, 1948
 Hotel El Conde, Caracas, 1948
 Beco Blohm Building, Caracas, 1948
 Cine El Prado, Caracas, 1948
 Cine Lidice, Caracas, 1948
 Cine Diana, Caracas, 1949
 Colimodio Building, Caracas, 1949
 Hotel Potomac, Caracas, 1949
 General Páez Building, 1949
 Karam Building, Caracas, 1949
 Cine Para Ti, Caracas, 1949
 Teatro Venezuela, Caracas, 1949
 Teatro Junín, Caracas, 1950
 Colegio Cervantes, Caracas, 1950s
 Caracas Building, Caracas, 1950s
 Cine La Vega, Caracas, 1950s
 Cine Aquiles Nazoa, Caracas, 1951
 Cine Lincoln, Caracas, 1951
 Pan American Building, Caracas, 1951
 New Annex El Recreo Agency Building, Caracas, 1952
 Cine Reforma, Caracas, 1952
 Teatro Radio City, Caracas, 1953
 Teatro Acacias, Caracas, 1956

Residential Works

 Silco Building, Caracas, 1939
 Veroes Building, Caracas, 1940
 Ramca Building, Caracas, 1940
 Caicara Building, Caracas, 1940
 Libertador Building, Caracas, 1940
 Andrés Bello Building, Caracas, 1940s
 Augustus Building, Caracas, 1940s
 López Gómez Building, Caracas, 1940s
 Las Piedras Building, Caracas, 1940s
 El Condado Building, Caracas, 1940s
 Ivan Building, Caracas, 1940s
 Dolores Building, Caracas, 1940s
 Che-co Building, Caracas, 1940s
 Rubén Gómez Building, Caracas, 1940s
 Poldor Building, Caracas, 1940s
 Concordia Building, Caracas, 1940s
 Tablitas Building, Caracas, 1940s
 El Sordo Building, Caracas, 1940s
 El Sorpel Building, Caracas, 1940s
 Gobernador Building, Caracas, 1940s
 Santa Clara Building, Caracas, 1940s
 Granaderos Building, Caracas, 1940s
 San Antonio Building, Caracas, 1940s
 Orleans Building, Caracas, 1940s
 Universal Building, Caracas, 1940s
 Campo Elías Building, Caracas, 1940s
 Cibeles & Embajadores Building, Caracas, 1940s
 Marconi & Codazzi Building, Caracas, 1940s
 Felipe Lemmo Building, Caracas, 1940s
 Mawdsley Building, Caracas, 1940s
 Québec & Perico Building, Caracas, 1940s
 Nevada Building, Caracas, 1940s
 Untitled Building, Caracas, 1940s
 Arno Building, Caracas, 1940s
 Jay Ros Building, Caracas, 1940s
 Rocco Building, Caracas, 1940s
 Asunción Building, Caracas, 1940s
 Acapulco Building, Caracas, 1940s
 Untitled Building, Caracas, 1940s
 El Águila Building, Caracas, 1940s
 Ferrenquín Building, Caracas, 1940s
 Puente República Building, Caracas, 1940s
 Brisas de Gamboa Building, Caracas, 1940s
 Madrid Building, Caracas, 1940s
 Jerez Building, Caracas, 1940s
 Bretaña Building, Caracas, 1940s
 Untitled Building, Caracas, 1940s
 Untitled Building, Caracas, 1940s
 Untitled Building, Caracas, 1940s
 Navarra Building, Caracas, 1940s
 Compostela Building, Caracas, 1940s
 Logroño & Rioja Building, Caracas, 1940s
 Málaga Building, Caracas, 1940s
 Óptimo Building, Caracas, 1940s
 Manduca Building, Caracas, 1940s
 Teñidero Building, Caracas, 1940s
 Tracabordo Building, Caracas, 1940s
 Candilito Building, Caracas, 1940s
 Miguelacho Building, Caracas, 1940s
 Mérida Building, Caracas, 1940s
 Aragua Building, Caracas, 1940s
 Pepito Building, Caracas, 1940s
 Albion Building, Caracas, 1940s
 Alcabala Building, Caracas, 1940s
 Ñaurali Building, Caracas, 1940s
 Esmirna Building, Caracas, 1940s
 Fortuna Building, Caracas, 1940s
 Esquina Calero Building, Caracas, 1940s
 Este Building, Caracas, 1940s
 Oriente Building, Caracas, 1940s
 Las Brisas Building, Caracas, 1940s
 El Cordero Building, Caracas, 1940s
 Padre Sierra Building, Caracas, 1940s
 Punceres Building, Caracas, 1940s
 Marbor Building, Caracas, 1940s
 Ziade Building, Caracas, 1940s
 Sonia Building, Caracas, 1940s
 Aryola Building, Caracas, 1940s
 Sosa Building, Caracas, 1940s
 El Taladro Building, Caracas, 1940s
 El Paradero Building, Caracas, 1940s
 Tritone Building, Caracas, 1940s
 Guadalupana Building, Caracas, 1940s
 Piar Building, Caracas, 1940s
 El Cesar Building, Caracas, 1940s
 Loreto Building, Caracas, 1940s
 Untitled Building, Caracas, 1940s
 Milagro Building, Caracas, 1940s
 Romot Building, Caracas, 1940s
 San Lorenz Building, Caracas, 1940s
 Excelsior Building, Caracas, 1940s
 Untitled Building, Caracas, 1940s
 Amagrazia Building, Caracas, 1940s
 San Bosco Building, Caracas, 1940s
 Empire Building, Caracas, 1940s
 Avila Building, Caracas, 1940s
 José Félix Ribas Building, Caracas, 1940s
 San Felipe Building, Caracas, 1940s
 San Andrés Building, Caracas, 1940s
 San Luis Building, Caracas, 1940s
 San Luis Building, Caracas, 1940s
 Urdaneta Building, Caracas, 1940s
 Avila Building, Caracas, 1940s
 Untitled Building, Caracas, 1940s
 Untitled Building, Caracas, 1940s
 Copacabana Building, Caracas, 1940s
 Evelyn Building, Caracas, 1940s
 Avila Building, Caracas, 1940s
 Untitled Building, Caracas, 1940s
 Pinto Building, Caracas, 1940s
 Vilco Building, Caracas, 1940s
 San José Building, Caracas, 1940s
 Joselito Building, Caracas, 1940s
 El Hoyo Building, Caracas, 1940s
 Andrey Building, Caracas, 1940s
 El Trabajo Building, Caracas, 1940s
 Ambos Mundos Building, Caracas, 1940s
 Ferrer Building, Caracas, 1940s
 Archanda Building, Caracas, 1940s
 Maury Building, Caracas, 1940s
 Avila Building, Caracas, 1940s
 Ayacucho Building, Caracas, 1940s
 N2 Building, Caracas, 1940s
 N5 Building, Caracas, 1940s
 Nº1 Building, Caracas, 1940s
 Nº2 Building, Caracas, 1940s
 Nº3 Building, Caracas, 1940s
 Nº4 Building, Caracas, 1940s
 Nº5 Building, Caracas, 1940s
 Nº6 Building, Caracas, 1940s
 Nº23 Building, Caracas, 1940s
 Nº28 Building, Caracas, 1940s
 Nº36 Building, Caracas, 1940s
 Nº36 Building, Caracas, 1940s
 Nº38 Building, Caracas, 1940s
 Nº102 Building, Caracas, 1940s
 Nº140 Building, Caracas, 1940s
 Nº216 Building, Caracas, 1940s
 Nº20 Building, Caracas, 1940s
 Cesare Building, Caracas, 1940s
 Untitled Building, Caracas, 1940s
 Untitled Building, Caracas, 1940s
 Santo Domingo Building, Caracas, 1940s
 El Lago Building, Caracas, 1940s
 Orinoco Building, Caracas, 1940s
 Fernandez Building, Caracas, 1940s
 Untitled Building, Caracas, 1940s
 La Campiña Building I, Caracas, 1940s
 La Campiña Building II, Caracas, 1940s
 Ávila Building, Caracas, 1940s
 Sorel Building, Caracas, 1940s
 Cantaura Building, Caracas, 1940s
 Sady Building, Caracas, 1940s
 El Bosque Building, Caracas, 1940s
 Montealegre Building, Caracas, 1940s
 Lincoln Building, Caracas, 1940s
 García Building, Caracas, 1940s
 Aldomar Building, Caracas, 1940s
 Mereyal Building, Caracas, 1940s
 Bellas Artes Building, Caracas, 1940s
 Caracas Building, Caracas, 1940s
 Untitled Building, Caracas, 1940s
 Untitled Building, Caracas, 1940s
 Untitled Building, Caracas, 1940s
 Untitled Building, Caracas, 1940s
 Mercaderes Building, Caracas, 1942
 La Candelaria Building, Caracas, 1944
 Building 5 Altamira, Caracas, 1947
 Aralar Building, Caracas, 1950
 San Francesco Building, Caracas, 1951
 San Felix Building, Caracas, 1951
 Gradillas Building A, Caracas, 1952
 Gradillas Building B, Caracas, 1952
 Zarikan Building, Caracas, 1953
 Alfaterna Building, Caracas, 1954

Houses

 Primavera House, Caracas, 1937
 Untitled House, Caracas, 1940s
 Roamar House, Caracas, 1940s
 Carmigrady House, Caracas, 1940s
 Untitled House, Caracas, 1940s
 Untitled House, Caracas, 1940s
 Untitled House, Caracas, 1940s
 House Nº12, Caracas, 1940s
 Untitled House, Caracas, 1940s
 Nina House, Caracas, 1940s
 Mercedes House, Caracas, 1940s
 Untitled House, Caracas, 1940s
 Untitled House, Caracas, 1940s
 Untitled House, Caracas, 1940s
 Magally House, Caracas, 1940s
 Mi Viejo House, Caracas, 1940s
 Maraux House, Caracas, 1940s
 Emizoma & La Paz Houses, Caracas, 1940s
 Nubia House, Caracas, 1940s
 Untitled House, Caracas, 1940s
 Yrma House, Caracas, 1940s
 Maria House, Caracas, 1940s
 Lilia House, Caracas, 1940s
 Untitled House, Caracas, 1940s
 Untitled House, Caracas, 1940s
 Ingenuo House, Caracas, 1944
 Villa Aurora, Caracas, 1950s

Maracaibo 
 Escuela Pública de Varones (Idelfonso Vásquez), Maracaibo, 1929
 Teatro Baralt, Maracaibo, 1932
 Hotel Victoria, Maracaibo, 1932
 Farmacia Pasteur, Maracaibo, 1930s
 Café Imperial, Maracaibo, 1930s
 La Casa Eléctrica, Maracaibo, 1930s
 La Ferretería Universal, Maracaibo, 1930s
 Ekmeiro Building, Maracaibo, 1930s
 Radio Ondas del Lago Building, Maracaibo, 1930s
 B.O.D Old Building, Maracaibo, 1930s
 Pasaje Universal Building, Maracaibo, 1930s
 Seguro Social Building, Maracaibo, 1930s
 Liceo Udón Pérez, Maracaibo, 1930s
 La Suiza Building, Maracaibo, 1936
 Standard Motor Company Building, Maracaibo, 1937
 Banco Agrícola y Pecuario Building, Maracaibo, 1939
 Cine Teatro Paraíso, Maracaibo, 1940-1960
 Cine Estrella, Maracaibo, 1940s
 Cine Boyacá, Maracaibo, 1940s
 Colegio Nuestra Señora de Chiquinquirá, Maracaibo, 1944
 Estadio Olímpico Alejandro Borges, Maracaibo, 1945
 Escuela de Medicina (LUZ), Maracaibo, 1945
 Plaza de la República, Maracaibo, 1945
 Cámara de Comercio, Maracaibo, 1946
 Iglesia San José, Maracaibo, 1947
 Iglesia Las Mercedes, Maracaibo, 1948
 Cine Imperio, Maracaibo, 1948
 El Automóvil Universal Building, Maracaibo, 1950
 Cine Paramount, Maracaibo, 1951
 Zulia Motors Building, Maracaibo, 1951

Maracay 

 Telares de Maracay, Maracay, 1926
 Teatro Ateneo, Maracay, 1926
 Baños Zoológico de Las Delicias, Maracay, 1928 
 Hotel Jardín, Maracay, 1930
 Hospital Civil, Maracay, 1930
 Cuartel Paéz, Maracay, 1930
 Tejero Family House, Maracay, 1931
 Teatro de la Ópera, Maracay, 1932
 La Plaza Tacarigua, Maracay, 1933
 Hotel Rancho Grande, Maracay, 1933-Inconclused
 Villa Cristina House, Maracay, 1934
 Cárcel Pública de Alayón, Maracay, 1937
 Liceo Militar Libertador, Maracay, 1937
 Cine Aragua, Maracay, 1930s
 Cine Royal, Maracay, 1930s
 Cine Maracay, Maracay, 1930s
 Cine Tropical, Maracay, 1930s
 House Organización Gnosis, Maracay, 1930s
 Cervecería Llanera Building, Maracay, 1930s
 La Primavera Cemetery, Maracay, 1930s
 Comercial Building, Maracay, 1930s
 Untitled House, Maracay, 1930s
 Untitled House, Maracay, 1930s
 Untitled House, Maracay, 1930s
 Untitled House, Maracay, 1930s
 Untitled House, Maracay, 1930s
 Workshop Building, Maracay, 1940s
 Workshop Building, Maracay, 1940s
 Workshop Building, Maracay, 1940s
 Workshop Building, Maracay, 1940s
 Workshop Building, Maracay, 1940s
 Workshop Building, Maracay, 1940s
 Untitled Building, Maracay, 1940s
 Untitled Building, Maracay, 1940s
 Untitled Building, Maracay, 1940s

See also 

 List of Art Deco architecture
 Art Deco topics
 Streamline Moderne architecture

References 

 
Art Deco